The Free Imperial City of Kempten was a Free Imperial City in the Swabian Circle.

History

In 1213, Holy Roman Emperor Frederick II declared the abbots of Kempten Abbey members of the Imperial Diet and granted the abbot the right to bear the title of Duke, making the abbey the Imperial Ducal Abbey of Kempten.

In 1289, King Rudolf of Habsburg granted special privileges to the settlement in the river valley, making it an Imperial City. In 1525 the last property rights of the abbots in the Imperial City were sold in the so-called "Great Purchase", marking the start of the co-existence of two independent cities bearing the same name next to each other.

The Imperial City converted to Protestantism in direct opposition to the Catholic monastery in 1527, signing the Augsburg Confession.

During the turmoil of the Thirty Years' War (1632–33), the city was destroyed by imperial forces.

During the Napoleonic Wars the Imperial City came under Bavarian rule (1802–03). In 1819, the city was united with the properties of the Abbey into a single communal entity.

References

City-states
Free imperial cities
Former republics
1802 disestablishments
States and territories established in 1289
Free Imperial City of Kempten